The province of East Nusa Tenggara (Provinsi Nusa Tenggara Timur) in Indonesia is divided into twenty-one regencies plus the independent city of Kupang. These in turn are divided administratively into districts, known as Kecamantan.

The districts of East Nusa Tenggara, with the regency each falls into, are as follows:

Villages
Administrative villages (desa) listed for each district:

References

 
East Nusa Tenggara